Polyethylene or polythene (abbreviated PE; IUPAC name polyethene or poly(methylene)) is the most commonly produced plastic. It is a polymer, primarily used for packaging (plastic bags, plastic films, geomembranes and containers including bottles, etc.). , over 100 million tonnes of polyethylene resins are being produced annually, accounting for 34% of the total plastics market.

Many kinds of polyethylene are known, with most having the chemical formula (C2H4)n. PE is usually a mixture of similar polymers of ethylene, with various values of n. It can be low-density or high-density: low-density polyethylene is extruded using high pressure and high temperature, while high-density polyethylene is extruded using low pressure and low temperature. Polyethylene is usually thermoplastic, but it can be modified to become thermosetting instead, for example, in cross-linked polyethylene.

History
Polyethylene was first synthesized by the German chemist Hans von Pechmann, who prepared it by accident in 1898 while investigating diazomethane. When his colleagues Eugen Bamberger and Friedrich Tschirner characterized the white, waxy substance that he had created, they recognized that it contained long −CH2− chains and termed it polymethylene.

The first industrially practical polyethylene synthesis (diazomethane is a notoriously unstable substance that is generally avoided in industrial application) was again accidentally discovered in 1933 by Eric Fawcett and Reginald Gibson at the Imperial Chemical Industries (ICI) works in Northwich, England. Upon applying extremely high pressure (several hundred atmospheres) to a mixture of ethylene and benzaldehyde they again produced a white, waxy material. Because the reaction had been initiated by trace oxygen contamination in their apparatus, the experiment was difficult to reproduce at first. It was not until 1935 that another ICI chemist, Michael Perrin, developed this accident into a reproducible high-pressure synthesis for polyethylene that became the basis for industrial low-density polyethylene (LDPE) production beginning in 1939. Because polyethylene was found to have very low-loss properties at very high frequency radio waves, commercial distribution in Britain was suspended on the outbreak of World War II, secrecy imposed, and the new process was used to produce insulation for UHF and SHF coaxial cables of radar sets. During World War II, further research was done on the ICI process and in 1944, Du Pont at Sabine River, Texas, and Union Carbide Corporation at South Charleston, West Virginia, began large-scale commercial production under license from ICI.

The landmark breakthrough in the commercial production of polyethylene began with the development of catalysts that promoted the polymerization at mild temperatures and pressures. The first of these was a catalyst based on chromium trioxide discovered in 1951 by Robert Banks and J. Paul Hogan at Phillips Petroleum. In 1953 the German chemist Karl Ziegler developed a catalytic system based on titanium halides and organoaluminium compounds that worked at even milder conditions than the Phillips catalyst. The Phillips catalyst is less expensive and easier to work with, however, and both methods are heavily used industrially. By the end of the 1950s both the Phillips- and Ziegler-type catalysts were being used for high-density polyethylene (HDPE) production. In the 1970s, the Ziegler system was improved by the incorporation of magnesium chloride. Catalytic systems based on soluble catalysts, the metallocenes, were reported in 1976 by Walter Kaminsky and Hansjörg Sinn. The Ziegler- and metallocene-based catalysts families have proven to be very flexible at copolymerizing ethylene with other olefins and have become the basis for the wide range of polyethylene resins available today, including very-low-density polyethylene and linear low-density polyethylene. Such resins, in the form of UHMWPE fibers, have (as of 2005) begun to replace aramids in many high-strength applications.

Properties
The properties of polyethylene can be divided into mechanical, chemical, electrical, optical, and thermal properties.

Mechanical 
Polyethylene is of low strength, hardness and rigidity, but has a high ductility and impact strength as well as low friction. It shows strong creep under persistent force, which can be reduced by addition of short fibers. It feels waxy when touched.

Thermal 
The commercial applicability of polyethylene is limited by its low melting point compared to other thermoplastics. For common commercial grades of medium- and high-density polyethylene the melting point is typically in the range . The melting point for average commercial low-density polyethylene is typically . These temperatures vary strongly with the type of polyethylene, but the theoretical upper limit of melting of polyethylene is reported to be . Combustion typically occurs above .

Chemical
Polyethylene consists of nonpolar, saturated, high-molecular-weight hydrocarbons. Therefore, its chemical behavior is similar to paraffin. The individual macromolecules are not covalently linked. Because of their symmetric molecular structure, they tend to crystallize; overall polyethylene is partially crystalline. Higher crystallinity increases density and mechanical and chemical stability.

The standard method to test plastic density is  ISO 1183 part 2 (gradient columns), alternatively ISO 1183 part 1 (MVS2PRO density analyzer).

Most LDPE, MDPE, and HDPE grades have excellent chemical resistance, meaning that they are not attacked by strong acids or strong bases and are resistant to gentle oxidants and reducing agents. Crystalline samples do not dissolve at room temperature. Polyethylene (other than cross-linked polyethylene) usually can be dissolved at elevated temperatures in aromatic hydrocarbons such as toluene or xylene, or in chlorinated solvents such as trichloroethane or trichlorobenzene.

Polyethylene absorbs almost no water; the gas and water vapour permeability (only polar gases) is lower than for most plastics. Oxygen, carbon dioxide and flavorings, on the other hand, can pass it easily.

PE can become brittle when exposed to sunlight, carbon black is usually used as a UV stabilizer.

Polyethylene burns slowly with a blue flame having a yellow tip and gives off an odour of paraffin (similar to candle flame). The material continues burning on removal of the flame source and produces a drip.

Polyethylene cannot be imprinted or bonded with adhesives without pretreatment. High-strength joints are readily achieved with plastic welding.

Electrical
Polyethylene is a good electrical insulator. It offers good electrical treeing resistance; however, it becomes easily electrostatically charged (which can be reduced by additions of graphite, carbon black or antistatic agents).
When pure, the dielectric constant is in the range 2.2 to 2.4 depending on the density  and the loss tangent is very low, making it a good dielectric for a capacitor

Optical 
Depending on thermal history and film thickness, PE can vary between almost clear (transparent), milky-opaque (translucent) and opaque. LDPE has the greatest, LLDPE slightly less, and HDPE the least transparency. Transparency is reduced by crystallites if they are larger than the wavelength of visible light.

Manufacturing process

Monomer

The ingredient or monomer is ethylene (IUPAC name ethene), a gaseous hydrocarbon with the formula C2H4, which can be viewed as a pair of methylene groups (−−) connected to each other. Typical specifications for PE purity are <5 ppm for water, oxygen, and other alkenes contents. Acceptable contaminants include N2, ethane (common precursor to ethylene), and methane. Ethylene is usually produced from petrochemical sources, but also is generated by dehydration of ethanol.

Polymerization

Polymerization of ethylene to polyethylene is described by the following chemical equation:

   (gas) → − (solid)Δ/ = 

Ethylene is a stable molecule that polymerizes only upon contact with catalysts. The conversion is highly exothermic. Coordination polymerization is the most pervasive technology, which means that metal chlorides or metal oxides are used. The most common catalysts consist of titanium(III) chloride, the so-called Ziegler–Natta catalysts. Another common catalyst is the Phillips catalyst, prepared by depositing chromium(VI) oxide on silica. Polyethylene can be produced through radical polymerization, but this route has only limited utility and typically requires high-pressure apparatus.

Joining

Commonly used methods for joining polyethylene parts together include:

 Welding
 Hot gas welding
 Infrared welding
 Laser welding
 Ultrasonic welding
 Heat sealing
 Heat fusion
 Fastening
 Adhesives 
 Pressure-sensitive adhesive (PSAs) 
 Dispersion of solvent-type PSAs
 Polyurethane contact adhesives
 Two-part polyurethane
 Epoxy adhesives
 Hot-melt adhesives
 Solvent bonding — Adhesives and solvents are rarely used as solvent bonding because polyethylene is nonpolar and has a high resistance to solvents. 
Pressure-sensitive adhesives (PSA) are feasible if the surface chemistry or charge is modified with plasma activation, flame treatment, or corona treatment.

Classification
Polyethylene is classified by its density and branching. Its mechanical properties depend significantly on variables such as the extent and type of branching, the crystal structure, and the molecular weight. There are several types of polyethylene:

Ultra-high-molecular-weight polyethylene (UHMWPE)
Ultra-low-molecular-weight polyethylene (ULMWPE or PE-WAX)
High-molecular-weight polyethylene (HMWPE)
High-density polyethylene (HDPE)
High-density cross-linked polyethylene (HDXLPE)
Cross-linked polyethylene (PEX or XLPE)
Medium-density polyethylene (MDPE)
Linear low-density polyethylene (LLDPE)
Low-density polyethylene (LDPE)
Very-low-density polyethylene (VLDPE)
Chlorinated polyethylene (CPE)

With regard to sold volumes, the most important polyethylene grades are HDPE, LLDPE, and LDPE.

Ultra-high-molecular-weight (UHMWPE)

UHMWPE is polyethylene with a molecular weight numbering in the millions, usually between 3.5 and 7.5 million amu. The high molecular weight makes it a very tough material, but results in less efficient packing of the chains into the crystal structure as evidenced by densities of less than high-density polyethylene (for example, 0.930–0.935 g/cm3). UHMWPE can be made through any catalyst technology, although Ziegler catalysts are most common. Because of its outstanding toughness and its cut, wear, and excellent chemical resistance, UHMWPE is used in a diverse range of applications. These include can- and bottle-handling machine parts, moving parts on weaving machines, bearings, gears, artificial joints, edge protection on ice rinks, steel cable replacements on ships, and butchers' chopping boards. It is commonly used for the construction of articular portions of implants used for hip and knee replacements. As fiber, it competes with aramid in bulletproof vests.

High-density (HDPE)

HDPE is defined by a density of greater or equal to 0.941 g/cm3. HDPE has a low degree of branching. The mostly linear molecules pack together well, so intermolecular forces are stronger than in highly branched polymers. HDPE can be produced by chromium/silica catalysts, Ziegler–Natta catalysts or metallocene catalysts; by choosing catalysts and reaction conditions, the small amount of branching that does occur can be controlled. These catalysts prefer the formation of free radicals at the ends of the growing polyethylene molecules. They cause new ethylene monomers to add to the ends of the molecules, rather than along the middle, causing the growth of a linear chain.

HDPE has high tensile strength. It is used in products and packaging such as milk jugs, detergent bottles, butter tubs, garbage containers, and water pipes. One-third of all toys are manufactured from HDPE. In 2007, the global HDPE consumption reached a volume of more than 30 million tons.

Cross-linked (PEX or XLPE)

PEX is a medium- to high-density polyethylene containing cross-link bonds introduced into the polymer structure, changing the thermoplastic into a thermoset. The high-temperature properties of the polymer are improved, its flow is reduced, and its chemical resistance is enhanced. PEX is used in some potable-water plumbing systems because tubes made of the material can be expanded to fit over a metal nipple and it will slowly return to its original shape, forming a permanent, water-tight connection.

Medium-density (MDPE)

MDPE is defined by a density range of 0.926–0.940 g/cm3. MDPE can be produced by chromium/silica catalysts, Ziegler–Natta catalysts, or metallocene catalysts. MDPE has good shock and drop resistance properties. It also is less notch-sensitive than HDPE; stress-cracking resistance is better than HDPE. MDPE is typically used in gas pipes and fittings, sacks, shrink film, packaging film, carrier bags, and screw closures.

Linear low-density (LLDPE)

LLDPE is defined by a density range of 0.915–0.925 g/cm3. LLDPE is a substantially linear polymer with significant numbers of short branches, commonly made by copolymerization of ethylene with short-chain alpha-olefins (for example, 1-butene, 1-hexene, and 1-octene). LLDPE has higher tensile strength than LDPE, and it exhibits higher impact and puncture resistance than LDPE. Lower-thickness (gauge) films can be blown, compared with LDPE, with better environmental stress cracking resistance, but they are not as easy to process. LLDPE is used in packaging, particularly film for bags and sheets. Lower thickness may be used compared to LDPE. It is used for cable coverings, toys, lids, buckets, containers, and pipe. While other applications are available, LLDPE is used predominantly in film applications due to its toughness, flexibility, and relative transparency. Product examples range from agricultural films, Saran wrap, and bubble wrap to multilayer and composite films. In 2013, the world LLDPE market reached a volume of US$40 billion.

Low-density (LDPE)

LDPE is defined by a density range of 0.910–0.940 g/cm3. LDPE has a high degree of short- and long-chain branching, which means that the chains do not pack into the crystal structure as well. It has, therefore, less strong intermolecular forces as the instantaneous-dipole induced-dipole attraction is less. This results in a lower tensile strength and increased ductility. LDPE is created by free-radical polymerization. The high degree of branching with long chains gives molten LDPE unique and desirable flow properties. LDPE is used for both rigid containers and plastic film applications such as plastic bags and film wrap. In 2013, the global LDPE market had a volume of almost US$33 billion.

The radical polymerization process used to make LDPE does not include a catalyst that "supervises" the radical sites on the growing PE chains. (In HDPE synthesis, the radical sites are at the ends of the PE chains, because the catalyst stabilizes their formation at the ends.) Secondary radicals (in the middle of a chain) are more stable than primary radicals (at the end of the chain), and tertiary radicals (at a branch point) are more stable yet. Each time an ethylene monomer is added, it creates a primary radical, but often these will rearrange to form more stable secondary or tertiary radicals. Addition of ethylene monomers to the secondary or tertiary sites creates branching.

Very-low-density (VLDPE)
VLDPE is defined by a density range of 0.880–0.915 g/cm3. VLDPE is a substantially linear polymer with high levels of short-chain branches, commonly made by copolymerization of ethylene with short-chain alpha-olefins (for example, 1-butene, 1-hexene and 1-octene). VLDPE is most commonly produced using metallocene catalysts due to the greater co-monomer incorporation exhibited by these catalysts. VLDPEs are used for hose and tubing, ice and frozen food bags, food packaging and stretch wrap as well as impact modifiers when blended with other polymers.

Much research activity has focused on the nature and distribution of long chain branches in polyethylene. In HDPE, a relatively small number of these branches, perhaps one in 100 or 1,000 branches per backbone carbon, can significantly affect the rheological properties of the polymer.

Copolymers
In addition to copolymerization with alpha-olefins, ethylene can be copolymerized with a wide range of other monomers and ionic composition that creates ionized free radicals. Common examples include vinyl acetate (the resulting product is ethylene-vinyl acetate copolymer, or EVA, widely used in athletic-shoe sole foams) and a variety of acrylates. Applications of acrylic copolymer include packaging and sporting goods, and superplasticizer, used in cement production.

Types of polyethylenes 
The particular material properties of "polyethylene" depend on its molecular structure. Molecular weight and crystallinity are the most significant factors; crystallinity in turn depends on molecular weight and degree of branching. The less the polymer chains are branched, and the lower the molecular weight, the higher the crystallinity of polyethylene. Crystallinity ranges from 35% (PE-LD/PE-LLD) to 80% (PE-HD). Polyethylene has a density of 1.0 g/cm3 in crystalline regions and 0.86 g/cm3 in amorphous regions. An almost linear relationship exists between density and crystallinity.

The degree of branching of the different types of polyethylene can be schematically represented as follows:

The figure shows polyethylene backbones, short-chain branches and side-chain branches. The polymer chains are represented linearly.

Chain branches 
The properties of polyethylene are highly dependent on type and number of chain branches. The chain branches in turn depend on the process used: either the high-pressure process (only PE-LD) or the low-pressure process (all other PE grades). Low-density polyethylene is produced by the high-pressure process by radical polymerization, thereby numerous short chain branches as well as long chain branches are formed. Short chain branches are formed by intramolecular chain transfer reactions, they are always butyl or ethyl chain branches because the reaction proceeds after the following mechanism:

Environmental issues

Polyethylene is produced from ethylene, and although ethylene can be produced from renewable resources, it is mainly obtained from petroleum or natural gas.

Moreover, the widespread usage of polyethylene poses difficulties for waste management if it is not recycled. Polyethylene, like other synthetic plastics, is not readily biodegradable, and thus accumulates in landfills. Recycling is made easier if marked with a recycling code or resin identification code. This can read "PE" or "02" ("plastic number 2") for PE-HD and "04" ("plastic number 4") for PE-LD.

In Japan, getting rid of plastics in an environmentally friendly way was the major problem discussed until the Fukushima nuclear disaster in 2011 became a larger issue. It was listed as a US$90 billion market for solutions. Since 2008, Japan has rapidly increased the recycling of plastics, but still has a large amount of plastic wrapping which goes to waste.

In 2010, a Japanese researcher, Akinori Ito, released the prototype of a machine which creates oil from polyethylene using a small, self-contained vapor distillation process.

Biodegradability
Polyethylene, like other synthetic plastics, is not readily biodegradable, and thus accumulates in landfills. However, there are a number of species of bacteria and animals that are able to degrade polyethylene.

In May 2008, Daniel Burd, a 16-year-old Canadian, won the Canada-Wide Science Fair in Ottawa after discovering that Pseudomonas fluorescens, with the help of Sphingomonas, can degrade over 40% of the weight of plastic bags within six weeks. He later guessed that it would be gone after six more weeks.

The thermophilic bacterium Brevibacillus borstelensis (strain 707) was isolated from a soil sample and found to use low-density polyethylene as a sole carbon source when incubated together at 50 °C. Biodegradation increased with time exposed to ultraviolet radiation.

Acinetobacter sp. 351 can degrade lower molecular-weight PE oligomers. When PE is subjected to thermo- and photo-oxidization, products including alkanes, alkenes, ketones, aldehydes, alcohols, carboxylic acid, keto-acids, dicarboxylic acids, lactones, and esters are released.

In 2014, a Chinese researcher named Jun Yang discovered that Indian mealmoth larvae could metabolize polyethylene from observing that plastic bags at his home had small holes in them. Deducing that the hungry larvae must have digested the plastic somehow, he and his team analyzed their gut bacteria and found a few that could use plastic as their only carbon source. Not only could the bacteria from the guts of the Plodia interpunctella moth larvae metabolize polyethylene, they degraded it significantly, dropping its tensile strength by 50%, its mass by 10% and the molecular weights of its polymeric chains by 13%.

In 2017, researchers reported that the caterpillar of Galleria mellonella eats plastic garbage such as polyethylene.

Climate change 
When exposed to ambient solar radiation the plastic produces two greenhouse gases, methane and ethylene. Of particular concern is the plastic type which releases gases at the highest rate: low-density polyethylene (or LDPE). Due to its low density properties it breaks down more easily over time, leading to higher surface areas. The production of these trace gases from virgin LDPE increase with surface area/time, with rates at the end of a 212-day incubation of 5.8 nmol g-1 d-1 of methane, 14.5 nmol g-1 d-1 of ethylene, 3.9 nmol g-1 d-1 of ethane and 9.7 nmol g-1 d-1 of propylene. When incubated in air, LDPE emits gases at rates ~2 times and ~76 times higher in comparison to water for methane and ethylene, respectively.

Chemically modified polyethylene 
Polyethylene may either be modified in the polymerization by polar or non-polar comonomers or after polymerization through polymer-analogous reactions. Common polymer-analogous reactions are in case of polyethylene crosslinking, chlorination and sulfochlorination.

Non-polar ethylene copolymers

α-olefins 
In the low pressure process α-olefins (e.g. 1-butene or 1-hexene) may be added, which are incorporated in the polymer chain during polymerization. These copolymers introduce short side chains, thus crystallinity and density are reduced. As explained above, mechanical and thermal properties are changed thereby. In particular, PE-LLD is produced this way.

Metallocene polyethylene (PE-MC) 
Metallocene polyethylene (PE-M) is prepared by means of metallocene catalysts, usually including copolymers (z. B. ethene / hexene). Metallocene polyethylene has a relatively narrow molecular weight distribution, exceptionally high toughness, excellent optical properties and a uniform comonomer content. Because of the narrow molecular weight distribution it behaves less pseudoplastic (especially under larger shear rates). Metallocene polyethylene has a low proportion of low molecular weight (extractable) components and a low welding and sealing temperature. Thus, it is particularly suitable for the food industry.

Polyethylene with multimodal molecular weight distribution
Polyethylene with multimodal molecular weight distribution consists of several polymer fractions, which are homogeneously mixed. Such polyethylene types offer extremely high stiffness, toughness, strength, stress crack resistance and an increased crack propagation resistance. They consist of equal proportions higher and lower molecular polymer fractions. The lower molecular weight units crystallize easier and relax faster. The higher molecular weight fractions form linking molecules between crystallites, thereby increasing toughness and stress crack resistance. Polyethylene with multimodal molecular weight distribution can be prepared either in two-stage reactors, by catalysts with two active centers on a carrier or by blending in extruders.

Cyclic olefin copolymers (COC) 
Cyclic olefin copolymers are prepared by copolymerization of ethene and cycloolefins (usually norbornene) produced by using metallocene catalysts. The resulting polymers are amorphous polymers and particularly transparent and heat resistant.

Polar ethylene copolymers 
The basic compounds used as polar comonomers are vinyl alcohol (Ethenol, an unsaturated alcohol), acrylic acid (propenoic acid, an unsaturated acid) and esters containing one of the two compounds.

Ethylene copolymers with unsaturated alcohols 
Ethylene/vinyl alcohol copolymer (EVOH) is (formally) a copolymer of PE and vinyl alcohol (ethenol), which is prepared by (partial) hydrolysis of ethylene-vinyl acetate copolymer (as vinyl alcohol itself is not stable). However, typically EVOH has a higher comonomer content than the VAC commonly used.

EVOH is used in multilayer films for packaging as a barrier layer (barrier plastic). As EVOH is hygroscopic (water-attracting), it absorbs water from the environment, whereby it loses its barrier effect. Therefore, it must be used as a core layer surrounded by other plastics (like LDPE, PP, PA or PET). EVOH is also used as a coating agent against corrosion at street lights, traffic light poles and noise protection walls.

Ethylene/acrylic acid copolymers (EAA)  
Copolymer of ethylene and unsaturated carboxylic acids (such as acrylic acid) are characterized by good adhesion to diverse materials, by resistance to stress cracking and high flexibility. However, they are more sensitive to heat and oxidation than ethylene homopolymers. Ethylene/acrylic acid copolymers are used as adhesion promoters.

If salts of an unsaturated carboxylic acid are present in the polymer, thermo-reversible ion networks are formed, they are called ionomers. Ionomers are highly transparent thermoplastics which are characterized by high adhesion to metals, high abrasion resistance and high water absorption.

Ethylene copolymers with unsaturated esters 
If unsaturated esters are copolymerized with ethylene, either the alcohol moiety may be in the polymer backbone (as it is the case in ethylene-vinyl acetate copolymer) or of the acid moiety (e. g. in ethylene-ethyl acrylate copolymer). Ethylene-vinyl acetate copolymers are prepared similarly to LD-PE by high pressure polymerization. The proportion of comonomer has a decisive influence on the behaviour of the polymer.

The density decreases up to a comonomer share of 10% because of the disturbed crystal formation. With higher proportions it approaches to the one of polyvinyl acetate (1.17 g/cm3). Due to decreasing crystallinity ethylene vinyl acetate copolymers are getting softer with increasing comonomer content. The polar side groups change the chemical properties significantly (compared to polyethylene): weather resistance, adhesiveness and weldability rise with comonomer content, while the chemical resistance decreases. Also mechanical properties are changed: stress cracking resistance and toughness in the cold rise, whereas yield stress and heat resistance decrease. With a very high proportion of comonomers (about 50%) rubbery thermoplastics are produced (thermoplastic elastomers).

Ethylene-ethyl acrylate copolymers behave similarly to ethylene-vinyl acetate copolymers.

Crosslinking 

A basic distinction is made between peroxide crosslinking (PE-Xa), silane crosslinking (PE-Xb), electron beam crosslinking (PE-Xc) and azo crosslinking (PE-Xd).

Shown are the peroxide, the silane and irradiation crosslinking. In each method, a radical is generated in the polyethylene chain (top center), either by radiation (h·ν) or by peroxides (R-O-O-R). Then, two radical chains can either directly crosslink (bottom left) or indirectly by silane compounds (bottom right).

Peroxide crosslinking (PE-Xa): The crosslinking of polyethylene using peroxides (e. g. dicumyl or di-tert-butyl peroxide) is still of major importance. In the so-called Engel process, a mixture of HDPE and 2% peroxide is at first mixed at low temperatures in an extruder and then crosslinked at high temperatures (between 200 and 250 °C). The peroxide decomposes to peroxide radicals (RO•), which abstract (remove) hydrogen atoms from the polymer chain, leading to radicals. When these combine, a crosslinked network is formed. The resulting polymer network is uniform, of low tension and high flexibility, whereby it is softer and tougher than (the irradiated) PE-Xc.
Silane crosslinking (PE-Xb): In the presence of silanes (e.g. trimethoxyvinylsilane) polyethylene can initially be Si-functionalized by irradiation or by a small amount of a peroxide. Later Si-OH groups can be formed in a water bath by hydrolysis, which condense then and crosslink the PE by the formation of Si-O-Si bridges. [16] Catalysts such as dibutyltin dilaurate may accelerate the reaction.
Irradiation crosslinking (PE-Xc): The crosslinking of polyethylene is also possible by a downstream radiation source (usually an electron accelerator, occasionally an isotopic radiator). PE products are crosslinked below the crystalline melting point by splitting off hydrogen atoms. β-radiation possesses a penetration depth of 10 mm, ɣ-radiation 100 mm. Thereby the interior or specific areas can be excluded from the crosslinking. However, due to high capital and operating costs radiation crosslinking plays only a minor role compared with the peroxide crosslinking. In contrast to peroxide crosslinking, the process is carried out in the solid state. Thereby, the cross-linking takes place primarily in the amorphous regions, while the crystallinity remains largely intact.
Azo crosslinking (PE-Xd): In the so-called Lubonyl process polyethylene is crosslinked preadded azo compounds after extrusion in a hot salt bath.

Chlorination and sulfochlorination
Chlorinated Polyethylene (PE-C) is an inexpensive material having a chlorine content from 34 to 44%. It is used in blends with PVC because the soft, rubbery chloropolyethylene is embedded in the PVC matrix, thereby increasing the impact resistance. It also increases the weather resistance. Furthermore, it is used for softening PVC foils, without risking the migrate of plasticizers. Chlorinated polyethylene can be crosslinked peroxidically to form an elastomer which is used in cable and rubber industry. When chlorinated polyethylene is added to other polyolefins, it reduces the flammability.

Chlorosulfonated PE (CSM) is used as starting material for ozone-resistant synthetic rubber.

Bio-based polyethylene

Braskem and Toyota Tsusho Corporation started joint marketing activities to produce polyethylene from sugarcane.

Polyethylene can also be made from other feedstocks, including wheat grain and sugar beet. These developments are using renewable resources rather than fossil fuel, although the issue of plastic source is currently negligible in the wake of plastic waste and in particular polyethylene waste as shown above.

Nomenclature and general description of the process
The name polyethylene comes from the ingredient and not the resulting chemical compound, which contains no double bonds. The scientific name polyethene is systematically derived from the scientific name of the monomer. The alkene monomer converts to a long, sometimes very long, alkane in the polymerization process. In certain circumstances it is useful to use a structure-based nomenclature; in such cases IUPAC recommends poly(methylene) (poly(methanediyl) is a non-preferred alternative). The difference in names between the two systems is due to the opening up of the monomer's double bond upon polymerization. The name is abbreviated to PE. In a similar manner polypropylene and polystyrene are shortened to PP and PS, respectively. In the United Kingdom and India the polymer is commonly called polythene, from the ICI trade name, although this is not recognized scientifically.

Footnotes

References

Bibliography

External links

Polythene's story: The accidental birth of plastic bags
Polythene Technical Properties & Applications
Article describing the discovery of Sphingomonas as a biodegrader of plastic bags  Kawawada, Karen, Waterloo Region Record (22 May 2008).

Polyolefins
Dielectrics
Ethylene
Thermoplastics
Packaging materials
Transparent materials
Bioplastics
Commodity chemicals
German inventions
1898 in science
1898 in Germany